The Sălătrucel (also: Coisca) is a left tributary of the river Olt in Romania. It discharges into the Olt in Jiblea Veche.

References

Rivers of Romania
Rivers of Vâlcea County